Jackson State Community College is a public community college in Jackson, Tennessee.  It is governed by the Tennessee Board of Regents and offers associate degrees in arts, science, and applied science programs. It has the largest enrollment of any college in Jackson.

Jackson State's first president was Dr. F.E. Wright, who served from 1967 until his death in 1976. Walter L. Nelms was president of the college for 21 years, until his retirement in 1997. He was succeeded by Charlie Delmer Roberts Jr., who served at Jackson State until 2004, when Dr. Bruce Blanding became the fourth president of the college. Blanding served until 2016 and was followed by Interim President Horace Chase, who served until December 2016, when Dr. Allana R. Hamilton was appointed as the fifth president of the college. Hamilton took office on January 10, 2017.  Dr. Hamilton served as President until 2019, when she was appointed as Vice President of Academic Affairs for the Tennessee Board of Regents. Dr. Jeff Sisk has been appointed as interim president until June 2, 2020.  Dr. George J. Pimentel was appointed as the sixth president at the Tennessee Board of Regents meeting in June 2020. 

Jackson State has branch campuses in Lexington, Tennessee, Savannah, Tennessee, Humboldt, Tennessee, and Paris, Tennessee.

Jackson State is home to four sport's teams: Men's Basketball, Women's Basketball, Baseball, and Softball.

Alumni 
Viola Harris McFerren (1931–2013) became a civil rights activist.

Notes

Community colleges in Tennessee
Educational institutions established in 1965
Universities and colleges accredited by the Southern Association of Colleges and Schools
Jackson, Tennessee
Education in Madison County, Tennessee
Education in Henderson County, Tennessee
Education in Hardin County, Tennessee
Buildings and structures in Madison County, Tennessee
NJCAA athletics
1965 establishments in Tennessee